Massariovalsa is a genus of fungi within the Melanconidaceae family.

The genus name of Massariovalsa is in honour of Giuseppe Filippo Massara (1792-1839), who was an Italian doctor and botanist, working in Sondrio.

The genus was circumscribed by Pier Andrea Saccardo in Michelia vol.2 on page 569 in 1882.

References

External links
Massariovalsa at Index Fungorum

Melanconidaceae